Bud Shank & the Sax Section is an album by saxophonist Bud Shank recorded in late 1966 for the Pacific Jazz label.

Reception

AllMusic rated the album with 3 stars and in the review by Scott Yanow, he states: "overall, the music on this out-of-print LP is reasonably enjoyable within its limitations".

Track listing
 "Summer Samba (So Nice)"  (Marcos Valle, Paulo Sérgio Valle, Norman Gimbel) - 3:05
 "On a Clear Day (You Can See Forever)" (Alan Jay Lerner, Burton Lane) - 3:20
 "Sidewinder" (Lee Morgan) - 2:47
 "Summertime" (George Gershwin, DuBose Heyward) - 3:23
 "And I Love Her" (John Lennon, Paul McCartney) - 3:12
 "The Grass Is Greener" (Howlett Smith, Spence Maxwell) - 2:20
 "Work Song" (Nat Adderley) - 2:50
 "Reza" (Edu Lobo, Ruy Guerra) - 3:00
 "Take Five" (Paul Desmond) - 2:20
 "Here's That Rainy Day" (Jimmy Van Heusen, Johnny Burke) - 3:10
 "A Time for Love" (Johnny Mandel, Paul Francis Webster) - 3:00
 "Señor Blues"  (Horace Silver) - 2:40

Personnel 
Bud Shank - alto saxophone, soprano saxophone
Bill Perkins - alto saxophone
Bob Cooper, Bob Hardaway - tenor saxophone
John Lowe, Jack Nimitz - baritone saxophone
Dennis Budimir - guitar
Ray Brown - bass
Larry Bunker  - drums
Unidentified orchestra arranged and conducted by Bob Florence

References 

1966 albums
Pacific Jazz Records albums
Bud Shank albums
Albums arranged by Bob Florence
Albums conducted by Bob Florence

Albums recorded at Capitol Studios